Taklung Tangpa is a Tibetan Buddhist title, referring back to the founding of the Taklung Kagyu 800 years ago.

It has some relationship with the biography of the 15th Talung Rinpoche.

External links
talungkagyu.org website

Tibetan Buddhist titles